Robert Propst may refer to:

Robert Propst (inventor) (1921–2000), American inventor
Robert Bruce Propst (1931–2019), American judge